Sandy Winnefeld (born James Alexander Winnefeld Jr.; April 24, 1956) is a retired United States Navy admiral who serves as the chair of the President's Intelligence Advisory Board since May 4, 2022. While on active duty, Winnefeld served as the ninth vice chairman of the Joint Chiefs of Staff from August 4, 2011 to July 31, 2015. 

He previously served as the fourth Commander, U.S. Northern Command (USNORTHCOM) and the 21st Commander, North American Aerospace Defense Command (NORAD) from May 19, 2010 to August 3, 2011. 

Prior to that, Winnefeld served as Director for Strategic Plans and Policy, Joint Staff which he concurrently served as the Senior Member, U.S. Delegation to the U.N. Military Staff Committee. His other operational commands include serving as the Commander, U.S. Sixth Fleet and Commander, Allied Joint Command Lisbon. 

As the Vice Chairman of the Joint Chiefs of Staff, Winnefeld was the second highest-ranking officer in the United States Armed Forces, second only to the Chairman of the Joint Chiefs of Staff. In 2015, he retired from the Navy after over 37 years of service. He currently serves on the board of directors for Raytheon Technologies, one of the largest aerospace and defense companies in the world.

Biography
Winnefeld's military lineage extended to his father and grandfather who both served in the Navy. His great-grandfather was a Prussian cavalryman.

Winnefeld graduated from Georgia Tech in 1978 with high honors in Aerospace Engineering and received his commission via the Navy Reserve Officer Training Corps program. 

While at Georgia Tech, he was a member of the Pi Kappa Alpha fraternity. After designation as a naval aviator, he served with two fighter squadrons and as an instructor at the Navy Fighter Weapons School (TOPGUN). While an instructor at TOPGUN, he worked with crew from Paramount Pictures on the production of the movie Top Gun.  Winnefeld went on to graduate with the highest distinction from the U.S. Naval War College off-campus program. He is a recipient of the Admiral William J. Crowe Award as Joint Staff Action Officer of the Year and the Vice Admiral William W. Behrens Jr. award as the honor graduate of his class at Nuclear Power School.

He led Enterprise through her 18th deployment, which included combat operations in Afghanistan in support of Operation Enduring Freedom immediately after the terrorist acts of September 11, 2001. As commander, Carrier Strike Group 2/Theodore Roosevelt Carrier Strike Group, he led Task Forces 50, 152 and 58 in support of Operation Iraqi Freedom and maritime interception operations in the Persian Gulf. He most recently served concurrently as Commander, U.S. Sixth Fleet; Commander, Allied Joint Command Lisbon; Commander, Striking and Support Forces NATO; Deputy Commander, U.S. Naval Forces Europe; and Joint Forces Maritime Component Commander, Europe.

His shore tours include service as an action officer in the Joint Staff Operations Directorate, as senior aide to the Chairman of the Joint Chiefs of Staff and as executive assistant to the Vice Chief of Naval Operations. As a flag officer he served ashore as Director, Warfare Programs and Transformational Concepts, United States Fleet Forces Command and as Director, Joint Innovation and Experimentation at United States Joint Forces Command.

Winnefeld is now a Distinguished Professor at the Sam Nunn School of International Affairs at Georgia Tech. He is also a non-resident senior fellow at the Belfer Center at  the Harvard Kennedy School.

Winnefeld began speaking out on his son's opioid overdose death and advocating for awareness of the opioid epidemic.

In an April 5, 2020 phone call to White House Chief of Staff Mark Meadows, Senate Minority Leader Chuck Schumer touted Winnefeld as a potential COVID-19 czar to oversee the production and disbursement of medical equipment.

In May 2022, Winnefeld was appointed to serve as chair of the President's Intelligence Advisory Board.

September 11 attacks 
Winnefeld was the commanding officer of the USS Enterprise during  the September 11 attacks. The Enterprise was headed to Cape Town, South Africa, for a port call. The crew was watching television at sea on September 11 and watched the hijacked United Airlines Flight 175 airliner strike the south tower of the World Trade Center. Acting without specific direction from the National Command Authority, then-Captain Winnefeld gave the order to put the ship's rudder over (180° degree turn) to take station in the Arabian Sea. 

The carrier's aircraft were within range of Afghanistan the next morning. For over three weeks starting on October 7, aircraft from Enterprise flew nearly 700 missions and dropped large amounts of ordnance over Afghanistan. The Chief of Naval Operations, Admiral Vern Clark praised Winnefeld and credited him for taking initiative as well as for the Enterprise's crew readiness.

Dates of rank

Military awards and decorations

He is also a recipient of the William J. Crowe, William W. Behrens Jr. awards and the 2012 recipient of the Naval War College Distinguished Graduate Leadership Award.

Stop the Addiction Fatality Epidemic (SAFE)
After losing a son to opioid addiction, the Winnefeld family began dedicating themselves to studying the issue. They launched a website called SafeProject.us with the goal of saving other families from experiencing the same tragedy.

Notes

External links

Official Joint Chiefs of Staff biography
Official United States Navy biography  at the United States Navy

|-

|-

|-

|-

|-

|-

|-

|-

1956 births
Georgia Tech alumni
Living people
Recipients of the Air Medal
Recipients of the Defense Distinguished Service Medal
Recipients of the Defense Superior Service Medal
Recipients of the Legion of Merit
Recipients of the Navy Distinguished Service Medal
United States Navy admirals